Acronia vizcayana is an Asian species of beetle in the family Cerambycidae. It is endemic to the Philippines.

Acronia
Beetles described in 2009